Cranshaws is a village on the B6355 road, near Duns, in the Scottish Borders area of Scotland, in the former Berwickshire.

Of Cranshaws Castle only the tower remains, at Cranshaws Farm on Cranshaws Hill.

Places nearby include Abbey St Bathans, Innerwick, Longformacus, Spott, East Lothian, Stenton, the Whiteadder Water, and Whittingehame.

See also
List of places in the Scottish Borders
List of places in Scotland
Patrick Hepburn of Waughton

References
 Brooke, C J (2000) Safe sanctuaries: security and defence in Anglo-Scottish border churches 1290-1690, Edinburgh, pages 50–1
 Fleming, Elma Berwickshire Monumental Inscriptions XIII Cranshaws, publ. Borders Family History Society

External links

RCAHMS record of Cranshaws Farm, Stable Courtyard
RCAHMS record of Cranshaws Castle
Ancient Stones: Nine Stone Rig, Cranshaws
Geograph image: Cranshaws Kirk
Geograph image: Cranshaws Castle, only the tower remains
Lammermuir Life: Cranshaws Kirk

Villages in the Scottish Borders